Raymond "Ray" Vigliotti is a retired American soccer defender who played professionally in the Major Indoor Soccer League and American Soccer League.

Vigliotti graduated from Laurel High School and played on the U-18 National Youth Team.  He attended the University of South Carolina where he played on the men's soccer team in 1978 and 1979.  In 1979, the New York Arrows selected Vigliotti in the Major Indoor Soccer League draft and spent two seasons with them.  He played the 1980 outdoor season with the Miami Americans of the American Soccer League. Vigliotti was a member of the 1980 US Olympic Soccer team that qualified for the Moscow Olympics, but could not attend due to the US' boycott of Russia's invasion of Afghanistan. In 1981, Vigliotti signed with the Tampa Bay Rowdies for the North American Soccer League's indoor season.  He played one game, then was released on December 24, 1981.  He moved to the Baltimore Blast for the remainder of the 1981–1982 season.  On October 2, 1982, Vigliotti signed as a free agent with the Wichita Wings for the 1982–1983 season and finished his career back with the Arrows during the 1983–1984 season.

References

External links
 MISL stats

Living people
1960 births
American soccer players
American Soccer League (1933–1983) players
Baltimore Blast (1980–1992) players
Major Indoor Soccer League (1978–1992) players
Miami Americans players
North American Soccer League (1968–1984) indoor players
New York Arrows players
South Carolina Gamecocks men's soccer players
Tampa Bay Rowdies (1975–1993) players
Wichita Wings (MISL) players
Association football defenders